United Investors Life Insurance Company (UILIC), based in Birmingham, Alabama, provides individual life insurance and annuity products. United Investors was founded in 1961. UILIC has more than $14 billion of insurance in force (as of 7/10). There are more than 150,000 policies in force and more than 1,400 licensed Agents nationwide. (as of 7/10) The Company is a wholly owned subsidiary of Protective Life Corporation.

United Investors Life Insurance Company has earned the A (Excellent) Financial Strength Rating from A.M. Best Company (as of 6/10).

History
Prior to October 1981, all outstanding stock of United Investors Life was held by Waddell & Reed, Inc. (90 percent), the distributor and manager of the “United Group” of Mutual Funds, and its parent, Continental Investment Corporation (10 percent), a financial services holding company. At that time, Torchmark Corporation, through a subsidiary, acquired all three companies. In the first quarter of 1998, 81 percent of United Investors Life was acquired by affiliate company, Liberty National Life Insurance Company. The remaining 19 percent was contributed by Torchmark to Liberty National in 2006. In December 2010, Torchmark sold United Investors Life to Birmingham, Alabama-based Protective Life Corporation.

References

Companies based in Birmingham, Alabama
Insurance companies of the United States
Dai-ichi Life
1961 establishments in Alabama
American companies established in 1961
Financial services companies established in 1961
1981 mergers and acquisitions
1998 mergers and acquisitions
2010 mergers and acquisitions